Sheree North (born Dawn Shirley Crang; January 17, 1932 – November 4, 2005) was an American actress, dancer, and singer, known for being one of 20th Century-Fox's intended successors to Marilyn Monroe.

Early life
North was born Dawn Shirley Crang in Los Angeles, California, on January 17, 1932, the daughter of June (née Shoard) and Richard Crang. Following her mother's remarriage to Edward Bethel, she was known as Dawn Shirley Bethel.

She began dancing in USO shows during World War II at age 10. In 1948, she married Fred Bessire. She had her first child at age 17 in 1949, and continued dancing in clubs under the stage name Shirley Mae Bessire.   (Already married at this age, her legal name at this time was Dawn Shirley Bessire.)

Career

Beginnings
North made her film début as an uncredited extra in Excuse My Dust (1951). She was then spotted by a choreographer performing at the Macayo Club in Santa Monica, and was cast as a chorus girl in the film Here Come the Girls (1953), starring Bob Hope. Around that time, she adopted the stage name Sheree North. She made her Broadway début in the musical Hazel Flagg, for which she won a Theatre World Award. She reprised her role in the film version, Living It Up (1954), starring Dean Martin and Jerry Lewis. In early 1954, at age 22, she appeared in a live TV version of Cole Porter's Anything Goes on The Colgate Comedy Hour, with Ethel Merman, Frank Sinatra, and Bert Lahr.

20th Century-Fox
In 1954, North signed a four-year contract with 20th Century-Fox. The studio had big plans for her, hoping to groom her as a replacement for the studio's leading—and increasingly uncontrollable—female star Marilyn Monroe. Fox tested North for leading roles in two of their upcoming productions, The Girl in Pink Tights and There's No Business Like Show Business—two films that had been offered to Monroe—while North was wearing Monroe's own studio wardrobe. After her screen tests, though, North was not cast in either film. In March 1954, North had a brush with scandal when she was revealed to have once danced in a bikini in an 8 mm erotic film. Fox capitalized on the publicity, as the studio previously had with Monroe's nude calendar posing in 1952.

In 1955, she was assigned the lead role opposite Betty Grable in How to Be Very, Very Popular (1955), a role that Marilyn Monroe had refused. Media attention surrounding Monroe's suspension, and North's hiring resulted in North appearing on the cover of Life  with the cover line "Sheree North Takes Over from Marilyn Monroe". How to Be Very, Very Popular did not live up to the hype Fox had generated, though North had appeared on What's My Line? to publicize the film and had been asked point-blank by one of the panelists if she has been associated with Monroe. The movie received mixed reviews from critics and was a moderate box-office success. Despite this, film historians, then and now, cite North's electrically charged dancing to "Shake, Rattle and Roll" as the film's most memorable scene.

In an attempt to promote North, Fox studio executives lobbied to cast her in films surrounded with popular stars. The studio had campaigned to cast her in a film with comedian Tom Ewell, hoping to repeat the success he had with Monroe in The Seven Year Itch (1955). Soon thereafter, the studio assigned North and Ewell to appear together in the romantic comedy The Lieutenant Wore Skirts, plotting the story of an army lieutenant whose husband tries to get her discharged. To promote the film, North posed for several publicity shots showing her legs. When the majority of the shots were released, only her legs appeared, with the tagline "Believe it or not, these legs belong to an army lieutenant." The film premiered with much fanfare in January 1956, and became a box-office success, grossing over $4 million in the United States. 

North's follow-up was The Best Things in Life Are Free (1956), a lavish musical in which her singing voice was dubbed by Eileen Wilson. She received fourth billing under Gordon MacRae, Dan Dailey, and Ernest Borgnine. It was an attempt by the studio to broaden North's audience appeal, and while it earned favorable reviews from critics, it did not become the success for which Fox had hoped. In 1956, Fox signed another blonde bombshell in the person of Broadway actress Jayne Mansfield to a contract, and began promoting her instead of North. Although Fox gradually lost interest in North, the studio continued to offer her a string of films. She was offered the lead role in a film called The Girl Upstairs, in which she would have parodied Monroe's on-screen persona.

When North's agent suggested she decline the film, Fox put her on suspension for two months. When her suspension was lifted one month later, North agreed to appear in The Way to the Gold, but only on the assurance that Elvis Presley would be her co-star. When Presley withdrew due to salary disagreements, he was replaced with Jeffrey Hunter, with whom North often quarreled. In the film, North attempted to progress from her blonde bombshell image, playing a sarcastic waitress, and while the film drew mixed reviews, it was a box-office success. 

She next starred in No Down Payment (1957), a melodrama about the lives of multiple families living in a California subdivision. Tony Randall played her alcoholic husband in the film. Although critically acclaimed, it was not a box-office success. The following year, she appeared in her final two films for Fox. In Love and War (1958) was a war drama film pairing her again with Jeffrey Hunter, and also with Robert Wagner, Dana Wynter, and Hope Lange. It was not a critical or financial success. Although the musical film genre had declined in profitability, she next co-starred in Mardi Gras (1958) with Pat Boone and Tommy Sands. It was her final film under her contract.

Later years
After North's contract with Fox ended in 1958, her career stalled, although she continued to act in films, television, and on the stage throughout the rest of her life. She guest-starred on episodes of The Untouchables and Gunsmoke (both 1963). North joined the cast of I Can Get It for You Wholesale in 1962, which featured Elliott Gould and introduced Barbra Streisand. She later guest-starred on a series of popular television series, including Ben Casey, Burke's Law (1963–65), The Virginian (1964–66), The Big Valley, The Iron Horse (both 1966), and The Fugitive (1965–67).

After an eight-year absence from film acting, North accepted a lead role in the B-movie science-fiction film Destination Inner Space (1966). The film opened to only a minor release in 1966 and has rarely been seen since. North co-starred with Elvis Presley in one of his final films, The Trouble with Girls (1969). 

When she was not working in films, she worked in musicals and many other theatrical productions. She appeared on Broadway doing a lively routine in the musical Hazel Flagg (1953), and won a Theatre World Award. This led directly to her being cast in the film Living It Up (1954). In 1962, she appeared on Broadway as Martha Mills in I Can Get It for You Wholesale, with Jack Kruschen, Elliott Gould, and Barbra Streisand in her Broadway debut. North also appeared in productions of Irma La Douce, Bye Bye Birdie, and Can-Can. In 1965, she took over from Shirley Knight in a Los Angeles production of Dutchman that coincided with the 1965 Watts riots. The production was controversial and was blamed by conservatives for inciting unrest. It was picketed, ads in newspapers were blocked, and North's car was set on fire. Despite that, the production ran for a year. 

From the 1960s onward, North focused mainly on becoming a solid and versatile character actress, appearing on almost every television Western, cop show, and medical drama produced from the 1960s through the 1990s. She displayed a talent for comic timing on many of the situation comedies of the era. She was a favorite in several made-for-television movies. She also earned Emmy nominations for appearances on Marcus Welby, M.D. (1969) and Archie Bunker's Place (1979). 

A favorite of film producer/director Don Siegel, she appeared in four of his films: in Madigan (1968) opposite Richard Widmark; in Charley Varrick (1973) with Walter Matthau; as John Wayne's long-lost love in the actor's final film The Shootist (1976); and in Telefon (1977). She had supporting roles in two Charles Bronson movies, Breakout (1975) with Robert Duvall, and Telefon. Other notable performances were in The Gypsy Moths (1969) with Burt Lancaster and Gene Hackman; and as Burt Lancaster's ex-lover in Michael Winner's Western, Lawman (1971) with Robert Ryan, Lee J. Cobb, Robert Duvall, and Albert Salmi. She also appeared in the crime drama The Organization (1971) with Sidney Poitier, and in The Outfit (1973) with Duvall, Joe Don Baker, and Karen Black.

Throughout the 1970s and 1980s, North appeared in guest spots on TV shows, including Hawaii Five-O, The Streets of San Francisco, McMillan & Wife,  Matlock, Family, and Magnum, P.I.. She played Lou Grant's girlfriend in several episodes of The Mary Tyler Moore Show. She co-starred with Sheldon Leonard in the short-lived CBS sitcom Big Eddie in 1975. During the 1980–81 season, North starred in I'm a Big Girl Now with Diana Canova, Danny Thomas, and Martin Short. The series aired 19 episodes. In 1980, she played Marilyn Monroe's mother in the made-for-television film Marilyn: The Untold Story. In 1983, she appeared in the ensemble cast of Steven Bochco's series Bay City Blues. The hour-long drama series aired eight episodes. North later appeared in two episodes of The Golden Girls as Blanche Devereaux's sister Virginia. 

In the 1990s, she appeared as Cosmo Kramer's mother Babs Kramer in two episodes of the sitcom Seinfeld. Her last screen role was in John Landis' black comedy Susan's Plan (1998).

Personal life
North was married four times and had two children. In 1948, at age 16, she married Fred Bessire, a draftsman, with whom she had a daughter, Dawn. The marriage ended in 1953. In 1955, she married television writer Bud Freeman; the marriage ended a year later. Her third marriage was to a psychologist, Gerhardt Sommer, with whom she had another daughter, Erica Eve. The marriage ended in divorce in 1963. At the time of her death, North was married to her fourth husband, Emmy Award-winning title designer Phillip "Phill" Norman.

On November 4, 2005, aged 73, North died of complications following surgery at Cedars-Sinai Medical Center.

Theatre
 Hazel Flagg (February 11, 1953 – September 19, 1953)
 I Can Get It for You Wholesale (March 22, 1962 – December 8, 1962)
 The Glass Menagerie (Laguna-Moulton Playhouse – January 3, 2000)

Filmography

 Excuse My Dust (1951) as Six Girl Club Member (uncredited)
 Here Come the Girls (1953) as Chorine with Elephant (uncredited)
 Living It Up (1954) as Jitterbug Dancer
 The Girl in Pink Tights (1954) (uncompleted)
 How to Be Very, Very Popular (1955) as Curly Flagg
 The Lieutenant Wore Skirts (1956) as Lt. Katy Whitcomb
 The Best Things in Life Are Free (1956) as Kitty Kane
 The Way to the Gold (1957) as Henrietta 'Hank' Clifford - waitress
 No Down Payment (1957) as Isabelle Flagg
 In Love and War (1958) as Lorraine
 Mardi Gras (1958) as Eadie West
 Destination Inner Space (1966) as Dr. Rene Peron
 Madigan (1968) as Jonesy
 The Gypsy Moths (1969) as Waitress
 The Trouble with Girls (1969) as Nita Bix
 Io sono la legge (1970)
 Lawman (1971) as Laura Shelby
 The Organization (1971) as Mrs. Morgan
 Charley Varrick (1973) as Jewell Everett
 The Outfit (1973) as Buck's Wife
 Breakout (1975) as Myrna
 The Shootist (1976) as Serepta
 Survival (1976) as Sheree
 Telefon (1977) as Marie Wills
 Rabbit Test (1978) as Mystery Lady
 Only Once in a Lifetime (1979) as Sally
 Maniac Cop (1988) as Sally Noland
 Cold Dog Soup (1990) as Mrs. Hughes
 Defenseless (1991) as Mrs. Bodeck
 Susan's Plan (1998) as Mrs. Beyers (final film role)

Television

 The Bing Crosby Show (CBS, January 3, 1954) as Herself
 The Colgate Comedy Hour (one episode, 1954) as Bonnie
 Shower of Stars (one episode, 1954)
 What's My Line? (one episode, 1955) as Herself
 Playhouse 90 (one episode, 1957) as Suzy
 The Witness (one episode, 1961) as Blossom Knight
 The Untouchables (one episode, 1963) as Claire Simmons
 Gunsmoke (one episode, 1963) as Avis Fisher
 The Eleventh Hour (one episode, 1963) as Peggy Lewis
 Breaking Point (two episodes, 1963) as Susan Beaumont / Lisa Adams
 The Great Adventure (one episode, 1964) as Agnes Lake
 Ben Casey (two episodes, 1963–1964) as Gloria Cooper / Lisa Adams
 The Greatest Show on Earth (one episode, 1964) as Gloria
 Burke's Law (three episodes, 1963–1965) as Cleo Delaney / The Maharani of Kooshipoo / Myrtle 'Gigi' String
 The Loner (one episode, 1965) as Cora Rice
 The Virginian (two episodes, 1964–1966) as Della Saunders / Karen Anders
 Run for Your Life (one episode, 1966) as Jeannie Lake
 The Big Valley (one episode, 1966) as Libby Mathews
 The Iron Horse (one episode, 1966) as Alix Henderson
 Code Name: Heraclitus (1967, TV Movie) as Sally
 Bob Hope Presents the Chrysler Theatre (three episodes, 1965–1967) as Sally / Mary
 The Fugitive (two episodes, 1965–1967) as Willy / Marianne Adams
 Mannix (one episode, 1968) as Rose Anderson
 Here Come the Brides (one episode, 1968) as Felicia
 Then Came Bronson (one episode, 1969) as Gloria Oresko
 My Friend Tony (one episode, 1969) as Vivian
 The Name of the Game (one episode, 1970) as Mrs. Palmer
 The Most Deadly Game (one episode, 1970) as Lottie
 The Interns (one episode, 1971) as Beth Calico
 Vanished (1971, TV Movie) as Beverly West
 The Smith Family (one episode, 1971) as Sheree
 Alias Smith and Jones (one episode, 1972) as Bess Tapscott
 Rolling Man (1972, TV Movie) as Ruby
 Cannon (one episode, 1972) as Millie Carroll
 Jigsaw (one episode, 1972)
 Trouble Comes to Town (1973, TV Movie) as Mrs. Murdock
 McMillan & Wife (one episode, 1973) as Dr. Marion Voight
 Snatched (1973, TV Movie) as Kim Sutter
 Kung Fu (one episode, 1973) as Noreen Gallagher
 Owen Marshall: Counselor at Law (one episode, 1973) as Evelyn Knight
 Hawkins (one episode, 1973) as Debbie Lane
 The Streets of San Francisco (one episode, 1973) as Donna Coughlin
 Maneater (1973, TV Movie) as Gloria Baron
 Key West (1973, TV Movie) as Brandi
 Hec Ramsey (one episode, 1974) as Esther Helpinstall
 Winter Kill (1974, TV Movie) as Betty
 Kojak (two episodes, 1974) as Mrs. Giancana
 Hawaii Five-O (one episode, 1974) as Doris Brown
 Barnaby Jones (one episode, 1974) as Roxy Morgan
 Wide World Mystery (one episode, 1974) as Mrs. Janet Swimmer
 The Whirlwind (1974, TV Movie)
 Movin' On (two episodes, 1974) as Dinah
 The Mary Tyler Moore Show (two episodes, 1974–1975) as Charlene Maguire
 A Shadow in the Streets (1975, TV Movie) as Gina Pulaski
 Medical Center (three episodes, 1971–1975) as Karen Porter / Sylvia Ronston
 Big Eddie (1975) as Honey Smith
 Marcus Welby, M.D. (one episode, 1976) as June Monica
 Most Wanted (1976) as Melissa Dawson
 Family (one episode, 1976) as Constance Hume
 Baretta (one episode, 1977) as Amy
 Future Cop (one episode, 1977) as Claire Hammond
 Westside Medical (two episodes, 1977) as Laurie
 Hallmark Hall of Fame (one episode, 1977) as Adele Serkin
 The Night They Took Miss Beautiful (1977, TV Movie) as Layla Burden
 Fantasy Island (one episode, 1978) as Julie
 A Real American Hero (1978, TV Movie) as Carrie Todd
 Amateur Night at the Dixie Bar and Grill (1979, TV Movie) as Lettie Norman
 Women in White (1979, TV Movie) as Lisa Gordon
 Portrait of a Stripper aka The Secret Life of Susie Hanson (1979, TV Movie) as Sally Evers
 Archie Bunker's Place (two episodes, 1979) as Dotty Wertz
 A Christmas for Boomer (1979, TV Movie) as Dorothy
 Marilyn: The Untold Story (1980, TV Movie) as Gladys Baker
 I'm a Big Girl Now (1980, cast member) as Edie McKendrick
 Legs (1983, TV Movie) as Ida
 Bay City Blues (four episodes, 1983) as Lynn Holtz
 Magnum, P.I. (one episode, 1984) as Blanche Rafferty
 Scorned and Swindled (1984, TV Movie) as Maxine Wagner
 Trapper John, M.D. (one episode, 1985) as Tilly Whiteside
 ABC Afterschool Special (one episode, 1986) as Madelyn
 Matlock (two episodes, 1986) as Alice Jenkins
 Murder, She Wrote (one episode, 1987) as Norma Lewis
 Jake Spanner, Private Eye (1989, TV Movie) as Mrs. Bernstein
 Freddy's Nightmares (one episode, 1989) as Joyce Burton
 Hunter (one episode, 1989) as Dorothy Nickens
 The Golden Girls (two episodes, 1985–1989) as Virginia Hollingsworth
 Dead on the Money (1991, TV Movie)
 Seinfeld (two episodes, 1995–1998) as Babs

Awards and honors
Theatre World Award
 Won: For performance in Hazel Flagg (1953)

Emmy Award
 Nominated: Outstanding Lead Actress for a Single Appearance in a Drama or Comedy Series, Marcus Welby, M.D. episode "How Do You Know What Hurts Me?" (1976)
 Nominated: Outstanding Lead Actress in a Comedy Series, Archie Bunker's Place'' (1980)

References

External links
 
 
 
 
 
 

1932 births
2005 deaths
20th-century American actresses
20th Century Studios contract players
Actresses from Los Angeles
American female dancers
American film actresses
American musical theatre actresses
American television actresses
Deaths from cancer in California
20th-century American singers
20th-century American women singers
20th-century American dancers